Joseph A. DeGuglielmo (1908-1983) was an American judge and politician who served as associate justice of the Boston Municipal Court and was mayor and city manager of Cambridge, Massachusetts.

Early life
DeGuglielmo was born and raised in Cambridge. He graduated from Harvard University in 1929 and Boston University School of Law in 1933. He was a member of the Alpha Phi Delta fraternity and was its national president. During World War II he served in the United States Army.

Public service career

Cambridge
DeGuglielmo began his public career in 1938 as assistant city solicitor of Cambridge. From 1945 to 1963 he was a member of the Cambridge City Council. From 1952 to 1954 he was mayor of Cambridge, an office that is appointed by the City Council. As mayor he was also chairman ex- officio of the School Committee. He later served as city manager from 1967 to 1968.

Jurist
In 1957, DeGuglielmo was appointed an assistant district attorney of Middlesex County.

In 1971, he was appointed an associate justice of the Boston Municipal Court by Governor Francis Sargent. He retired from the bench in 1978.

Other political activities
DeGuglielmo served as chairman of the Cambridge Democratic Committee. He was friend of John F. Kennedy and campaigned for him during Kennedy's first congressional run.

Personal life
DeGuglielmo was married twice. His first wife, Angela Ferraro, died in 1974. He remained married to his second wife, Alice O'Regan, until his death in 1978.

His nephew is comic Jimmy Tingle.

Death
DeGuglielmo died on May 18, 1983 in Boston.

References

Boston University School of Law alumni
City managers of Cambridge, Massachusetts
Harvard University alumni
Cambridge, Massachusetts City Council members
Massachusetts state court judges
Mayors of Cambridge, Massachusetts
Lawyers from Cambridge, Massachusetts
1983 deaths
1908 births
20th-century American lawyers
20th-century American judges
20th-century American politicians